Tonga (Chitonga), also known as Zambezi, is a Bantu language primarily spoken by the Tonga people (Batonga) who live mainly in the Southern province, Lusaka province, Central Province and Western province of Zambia, and in northern Zimbabwe, with a few in Mozambique. The language is also spoken by the Iwe, Toka and Leya people, and perhaps by the Kafwe Twa (if they are not Ila), as well as many bilingual Zambians and Zimbabweans. In Zambia Tonga is taught in schools as first language in the whole of Southern Province, Lusaka and Central Provinces.

It is one of the major lingua francas in Zambia, together with Bemba, Lozi and Nyanja. The Tonga of Malawi, which is classified by Guthrie as belonging to zone N15, is not particularly close to Zambian Tonga, which is classified as zone M64, and can be considered a separate language.

The Tonga-speaking inhabitants are the oldest Bantu settlers, with the Tumbuka, a small ethnic group in the east, in what is now known as Zambia. There are two distinctive dialects of Tonga; Valley Tonga and Plateau Tonga.  Valley Tonga is mostly spoken in the Zambezi valley and southern areas of the Batonga (Tonga people) while Plateau Tonga is spoken more around Monze District and the northern areas of the Batonga.

Tonga (Chitonga or isiTonga) developed as a spoken language and was not put into written form until missionaries arrived in the area. The language is not standardized, and speakers of the same dialect may have different spellings for the same words once put into written text.

At least some speakers have a bilabial nasal click where neighboring dialects have /mw/, as in mwana 'child' and kunwa 'to drink'.

Maho (2009) removes Shanjo as a separate, and not very closely related, language.

Phonology

Consonants 

 /l/ can also be heard as a tap sound [ɾ] in free variation.
 Post-alveolar affricates /t͡ʃ, d͡ʒ, ⁿd͡ʒ/ can also be heard as palatal stops [c, ɟ, ᶮɟ] in free variation among dialects.
 /w/ can also be heard as a labio-palatal [ɥ] when occurring before /i/.
 /f, v/ can also be heard as glottal fricatives [h, ɦ] in the Plateau dialect.
 /sʲ, zʲ/ are heard as voiceless and breathy palatal approximants [j̊, j̤] in the Northern dialects.

Vowels

Verbs
Tonga or Chitonga follows the standard Bantu language structure. A single word may incorporate a subject-marker, a tense-marker, a direct object, and even an indirect object, combined with the verb root itself.

Tonal system
Tonga is a tonal language, with high and low-toned syllables. The placement of the tones is complex and differs from that of other Bantu languages; for example, a syllable which is low in Tonga may be high in the cognate word in other Bantu languages and vice versa. Several scholars, beginning with A. E. Meeussen in 1963, have tried to discover the rules for where to place the tones. 

One feature of the tonal system is that high tones tend to get disassociated from their original place and move to the left, as is illustrated in these examples:
íbúsi 'smoke'
ibusu 'flour'

In these words, the original high tone of the root -sí has moved to the prefix ibu-, whereas the low tone of -su has not affected the prefix.

The above example of a noun is relatively easy to explain. However, the tones of the verbal system are more complex. An example of one of the puzzles discussed by both Meeussen and Goldsmith can be seen below:

ndi-la-lang-a 'I look at'
ba-la-lang-a 'they look at'
ndi-la-bon-a 'I see'
ba-lá-bon-a 'they see'

The high tone on the tense-marker la in the fourth verb is puzzling. If it comes from the verb root bon, it is hard to see why it does not also appear in the 1st person ndi-la-bon-a. 

Some scholars, such as Carter and Goldsmith, have analysed Tonga as having both tones and accents (the accents in Tonga being mainly on low-toned syllables). Others, such as Pulleyblank, analyse the same data purely in terms of tonal rules, without the need to introduce accents.

References

External links

Universal Declaration of Human Rights in Chitonga
Glossary of Chitonga, in English and German
Chitonga Glossary
OLAC resources in and about the Tonga language
OLAC resources in and about the Dombe language
Chitonga language books, Lubuto Library Special Collections

 
Botatwe languages
Languages of Mozambique
Languages of Zambia
Languages of Zimbabwe
Library of Congress Africa Collection related
Tonal languages
Tone (linguistics)